Eugene Leid Shirk (April 14, 1901 – February 17, 1994) was an American politician who served as the Mayor of Reading, Pennsylvania for two terms as a Republican. He was also the president of Berks Community Television, a professor at Albright College and a prominent philanthropist.

Biography
Shirk graduated Phi Beta Kappa from Franklin & Marshall College in Lancaster, Pennsylvania. He also pursued graduate work at the University of Pennsylvania in Philadelphia.

Shirk was married to Annadora Shirk, a former member of the Reading School Board during the 1950s or 1960s. The couple had two children, Al and Thea.

Shirk was a former Vice President of the Middle Atlantic States Collegiate Athletics Association, now called the Middle Atlantic Conferences.

References

1901 births
1994 deaths
Place of death missing
Mayors of Reading, Pennsylvania
American sports executives and administrators
Educators from Pennsylvania
Albright College faculty
Franklin & Marshall College alumni
Pennsylvania Republicans
20th-century American politicians
20th-century American philanthropists